Chlewiska  is a village in Szydłowiec County, Masovian Voivodeship, in east-central Poland. It is the seat of the gmina (administrative district) called Gmina Chlewiska.

The village has a population of 1,089.

References

Villages in Szydłowiec County